Ştefan Iordache (3 February 1941 – 14 September 2008) was a Romanian actor.

Iordache was born in Calafat.  In 2006, he was voted the best actor in Romania. He died, aged 67, in Vienna, Austria.

Selected films
Inimă de țigan (2007) - Didi Sfiosu
Ticalosii (2007) — Didi Sfiosu 
The Earth's Most Beloved Son (1993) — Victor Petrini
Cei care platesc cu viata (1991) — Serban Saru-Sinesti
Ciuleandra (1985)
Glissando (1985)
De ce trag clopotele, Mitică? (1981)

References

External links
 

1941 births
2008 deaths
Romanian male actors
Deaths from leukemia
Deaths from cancer in Austria